Schistura udomritthiruji is a species of stone loach, a riverine fish found in streams in southern Thailand.

References

External links
Schistura udomritthiruji FishBase 2015.

Fish of Thailand
Fish described in 2010
udomritthiruji